Real Chance of Love is an American reality television dating game show featuring two brothers, Ahmad "Real" Givens (born on January 8, 1982, died on February 21, 2015, aged 33) and Kamal "Chance" Givens, (born on March 25, 1981), of the rap group The Stallionares, former contestants on I Love New York, who are looking for love. The show was first brought up in August 2007 when Mr. Boston of the first season of I Love New York was offered his own reality show. Boston declined and the plans eventually fell through, leaving the show to be picked up by Real and Chance.

Season one

The first season premiered October 20, 2008, and featured seventeen female contestants taking part in various challenges in a format similar to other VH1 and MTV dating contest programs. Each week, women were eliminated until the final episode where the brothers had to make their final selections. Ultimately, Ahmad (Real) selected Corn Fed, while Kamal (Chance) selected nobody. The series consisted of 14 episodes. A few days after the reunion show was taped, Corn Fed and Real ended their relationship.

Season two

It was reported on the VH1 blog that there will be a "second season" of Real Chance of Love, with the working title Real Chance of Love 2. Twenty women will move into the Stallionaire Ranch and compete for the brother of their choice. In March 2009, Real Chance of Love 2 auditions were held in selected cities. Real and Chance appeared on Chelsea Lately on May 25, 2009, to talk about the second season of Real Chance of Love. The show premiered on August 3, 2009. Ultimately, Ahmad (Real) selected Doll, while Kamal (Chance) selected Hot Wings.

Airing of the show

Spin-offs
I Love Money features contestants from Real Chance of Love, Rock of Love, I Love New York, and Flavor of Love competing in different challenges for the ultimate prize of $250,000.
Charm School with Ricki Lake features contestants from Real Chance of Love and Rock of Love Bus.

One Mo' Chance

References

External links
 Real Chance of Love Official Site

2000s American game shows
2008 American television series debuts
2009 American television series endings
2000s American reality television series
VH1 original programming
American dating and relationship reality television series
English-language television shows
African-American reality television series
Television series by 51 Minds Entertainment
Television shows set in Los Angeles